Max Josef Beer  (August 25, 1851 - 25 November 1908 in Vienna) was an Austrian composer.

Max Josef Beer studied with Dessoff and at a very young age received emolument from the Austrian government for the compositions “Ariadne auf Naxos,” “Die Auferweckung des Lazarus,” and a number of songs.

On 15 February 1871, his opera seria in four acts, "Elizabeth of Hungary," premiered at Milan's La Scala, starring Elisabetta Sternberg (soprano), Louis Auguste Arsandaux (tenor), Jean-Louis Lasalle (baritone) and Joseph-Victor Warot (bass). 

Beer also wrote "Der Streik der Schmiede," a realist one act opera, which unsuccessfully premiered at Augsburg, 1897.

He died in Vienna at age 57.

Other Compositions 

Fünf Minnelieder for Pianoforte
Sechs Lieder für eine Singstimme for voice with piano accompaniment
Eichendorffiana, 9 Piano Pieces
Ghazals, 6 Piano Pieces
Lyrisches Intermezzo, Four impressions for piano
Sturm und Stille, 6 songs based on poems by C. Stögmann, O. v. Redwitz, Heinrich Heine, Friedrich Rückert
Des Sängers Fluch, after Ludwig Uhland, for declamation with piano accompaniment
Ein Fastnachtsmärchen, 8 Carnival pieces for piano
Aus lichten Tagen, 4 Clavier-poetry
Abendfeier, Three Fantasy Pieces for piano, four hands
Liebesleben for soprano, tenor, bass and piano
Haidebilder aus Ungarn. 3 Piano Pieces for 4 Hands
The beautiful waitress from Bacharach and their guests, Five poems by N. Müller for a deeper voice with piano accompaniment
Aus der Minnezeit, song cycle for women's choir and piano accompaniment. Op. 31
Sweet Evening comes with a soft air, Solo and chorus for male voices, texts by AJ Foxwell. Op. 25

References

External links 
 http://www.biographien.ac.at/oebl_1/64.pdf

1851 births
1908 deaths
19th-century classical composers
19th-century Austrian male musicians
20th-century classical composers
20th-century male musicians
Austrian Jews
Austrian male classical composers
Austrian Romantic composers
Jewish classical composers